Jolijn van Valkengoed (born August 26, 1981 in Lelystad) is a Dutch swimmer, who is mainly specialized in breaststroke. She is currently training in her hometown Lelystad together with her younger brother Thijs. At the age of 24 she made her international debut at the European Championships 2006 in Budapest. At the 2008 European Aquatics Championships in Eindhoven she won a bronze medal in the 4×100 medley relay. She also qualified for Beijing 2008 as the breaststroke swimmer in the 4×100 medley relay. At the short course she has been the owner of the national record in the 50 m breaststroke.

See also 
 List of Dutch records in swimming
 List of swimmers

References 

1981 births
Living people
People from Lelystad
Dutch female breaststroke swimmers
Olympic swimmers of the Netherlands
Swimmers at the 2008 Summer Olympics
European Aquatics Championships medalists in swimming
Sportspeople from Flevoland